Attachment may refer to:

Entertainment
 Attachments (novel), a 2011 novel by Rainbow Rowell
 Attachments (TV series), a BBC comedy-drama that ran from 2000 to 2002

Law
 Attachment (law), a means of collecting a legal judgment by levying on a specific property in the possession of the opposing party.
 Attachment of earnings, collecting money owed by a debtor directly from the debtor's employer
 Rule B Attachment, provided under the US Federal Rules of Civil Procedure for freezing a defendant's property in pursuit of a maritime claim

Technology
 AT Attachment, a computer disk drive interface standard
 Email attachment
 Excavator attachment added onto construction equipment to alter its function
 Rental attachments, components attached to rental machinery

Other
 Attachment theory, psychological model attempting to describe the dynamics of relationships between humans
 The binding of a virus to its target cell
 Moh, a vice in Sikh religion
 Upādāna, a cause of suffering in Buddhism